Valeriia Vasylivna Gudym (born 1 March 1995) is a Ukrainian group rhythmic gymnast. She represents her nation at international competitions.

Gudym participated at the 2012 Summer Olympics.
She also competed at world championships, including at the 2014 World Rhythmic Gymnastics Championships.
At the 2015 European Games in Baku she won a silver medal in the group ribbons event and a bronze medal in the group clubs and hoops event.

References

External links

1995 births
Living people
Ukrainian rhythmic gymnasts
Gymnasts from Kyiv
Gymnasts at the 2015 European Games
European Games medalists in gymnastics
European Games silver medalists for Ukraine
European Games bronze medalists for Ukraine
Gymnasts at the 2012 Summer Olympics
Olympic gymnasts of Ukraine
Medalists at the Rhythmic Gymnastics World Championships
Universiade medalists in gymnastics
Universiade gold medalists for Ukraine
Universiade silver medalists for Ukraine
Universiade bronze medalists for Ukraine
Medalists at the 2013 Summer Universiade
Medalists at the 2015 Summer Universiade
Medalists at the 2017 Summer Universiade
21st-century Ukrainian women